Sassafras was a champion racehorse.

Sent initially to the Ballylinch Stud at Thomastown in County Kilkenny, Ireland, Sassafras was the sire of the winners over 72 races. Sassafras sired Galway Bay who was a stakes winner in Great Britain and Australia before becoming the sire of stakes winners.

References

External links
 Sassafrás' pedigree

individual male horses